Franciscus Waterreus (19 November 1902 – 11 December 1962) was a Dutch cyclist. He competed in the team pursuit at the 1924 Summer Olympics.

See also
 List of Dutch Olympic cyclists

References

External links
 

1902 births
1962 deaths
Dutch male cyclists
Olympic cyclists of the Netherlands
Cyclists at the 1924 Summer Olympics
Sportspeople from Eindhoven
Cyclists from North Brabant